The Huai Kha Khaeng Wildlife Sanctuary is in Uthai Thani and Tak Provinces, Thailand. The park was established in 1974, and is part of the largest intact seasonal tropical forest complex in Mainland Southeast Asia. It, coupled with the Thungyai Naresuan Wildlife Sanctuary was declared a World Heritage Site by the United Nations in 1991. Together, the two sanctuaries occupy 622,200 hectares.  it still contained viable populations of large mammals, including gibbons, bears, elephants and Indochinese tigers, although like all other sites in mainland Southeast Asia, some species (e.g., rhinoceroses) have disappeared or have experienced severe declines.

History
After the establishment of the wildlife sanctuary on 4 September 1972, it covered an area of 1,019,375 rai ~ . The wildlife sanctuary was then expanded twice, first on 21 May 1986 to 1,609,150 rai ~  , an increase of 589,775 rai ~  and on 30 December 1992 to 1,737,587 rai ~  an increase of 718,212 rai ~ . Until 1976 there were Karen villages within the wildlife sanctuary. Today the wildlife sanctuary no longer has any known human population living in the area. Some Karen villages were moved in 1976 from the southernmost area to Ban Rai District to the southeast. A Hmong village in the west was moved after 1986.

Wildlife
A large number of the animal and plant life diversity can be found nowhere else, with species such as the Sino-Himalayan, Indo-Burmese, Sundaic, and Indo-Chinese affinities, living in the wildlife sanctuary. Species present at the wildlife sanctuary are usually rare, endangered, or local. Roughly one-third of Southeast Asia's mammals are said to be thriving within the wildlife sanctuary. The wildlife sanctuary is responsible for three of the National Reserved Wildlife Species of Thailand: wild water buffalo (Bubalus arnee), mainland serow (Capricornis sumatraensis), and Indian hog deer (Hyelaphus porcinus). Many species of birds, reptiles, and amphibians have also been reported. Sighting of 355 bird species have been recorded in the wildlife sanctuary, a lot of these species are now rare in Thailand and some are considered endangered. There are currently 90 wild Indochinese tigers within the sanctuary.

Visitor and scientific research facilities
The wildlife sanctuary receives most visitors during the summer or the "dry season". Some sections of the sanctuary are not open to the public without permission. The Conservation Office in Bangkok and the chief of Huai Kha Khaeng are responsible for granting permission to those who wish to visit prohibited areas.

References

External links 

Royal Gazette publications on Huai Kha Khaeng (Thai)
 Issue 89 chapter 132 of September 4 1972
 Issue 103 chapter 87 of May 21 1986
 Issue 109 chapter 126 of December 30 1992

World Heritage Sites in Thailand
Wildlife sanctuaries of Thailand
Geography of Kanchanaburi province
Geography of Tak province
Geography of Uthai Thani province
Protected areas established in 1972
1972 establishments in Thailand
Dawna Range